The 1980 Rice Owls football team was an American football team that represented Rice University in the Southwest Conference during the 1980 NCAA Division I-A football season. In their third year under head coach Ray Alborn, the team compiled a 5–6 record. 

The Owls' 17-7 victory vs. LSU ended a 13-game winless streak vs. the Bayou Bengals. It was Rice's first victory vs. LSU since 1966, the last season the Owls were coached by the legendary Jess Neely.

Schedule

Roster

References

Rice
Rice Owls football seasons
Rice Owls football